Stefano De Angelis (born 23 May 1974) is an Italian football manager and a former player who played as defender. He is currently working as assistant coach at Ħamrun Spartans.

Coaching career
On 30 October 2020, he joined Serie D club Ostiamare.

On 13 November 2021 he was announced as technical collaborator of head coach Karel Zeman at Lavello.

He successively left Lavello to join Ħamrun Spartans as an assistant coach.

References

1974 births
Living people
Italian footballers
U.S. Siracusa players
S.S. Ischia Isolaverde players
A.S. Gualdo Casacastalda players
Cosenza Calcio players
Cagliari Calcio players
U.S. Salernitana 1919 players
Genoa C.F.C. players
U.S. Catanzaro 1929 players
U.S. Avellino 1912 players
S.F. Aversa Normanna players
Association football defenders
Serie B players
Italian football managers
Serie C managers